Rambert is a surname. Notable people with the surname include:

Ángel Rambert (1936–1983), Argentine-born French footballer
Eugène Rambert (1830–1886), Swiss author and poet
Marie Rambert (1888–1982), Polish-born dancer and pedagogue
Pascal Rambert (born 1962), French writer, choreographer and director for the stage and screen
Pep Rambert (1916–1974), American baseball pitcher
Sebastián Rambert (born 1974), Argentine footballer

See also
Rambert Dance Company, British dance company
Canton of Saint-Just-Saint-Rambert, French administrative division
Gare de Saint-Rambert-en-Bugey, railway station in France
Saint-Rambert-d'Albon, commune in the Drôme department in southeastern France
Saint-Just-Saint-Rambert, commune in the Loire department in central France

References